is a town located in Yamagata Prefecture, Japan. ,  the town had an estimated population of 7,376 in 3020 households, and a population density of 10 persons per km2.

Geography
Oguni is located in mountainous southwestern Yamagata Prefecture, bordered by Niigata Prefecture to the west and south.

Neighboring municipalities
Yamagata Prefecture
Nagai
Asahi
Nishikawa
Iide
Niigata Prefecture
Shibata
Murakami
Tainai
Sekikawa

Climate
Oguni has a Humid continental climate (Köppen climate classification Cfa) with large seasonal temperature differences, with warm to hot (and often humid) summers and cold (sometimes severely cold) winters. Precipitation is significant throughout the year, but is heaviest from August to October. In the winter season, snow cover may exceed 2 meters even in the center of town due to the monsoon from the Sea of Japan.

Demographics
Per Japanese census data, the population of Oguni peaked in the 1950s, and is now considerably less than what it was a century ago.

History
The area of present-day Oguni was part of ancient Dewa Province and was ruled as part of Yonezawa Domain during the Edo period. After the start of the Meiji period, most of the area became part of Nishiokitama District, Yamagata Prefecture. The village of Ogunimoto was established on April 1, 1889 with the creation of the modern municipalities system. It was elevated to town status on November 3, 1943, becoming the town of Oguni. It absorbed the neighboring villages of Minamioguni and Kitaoguni on March 31, 1954 and the village of Tsugawa on August 1, 1960.

Economy
The economy of Oguni is based on agriculture and forestry, and hydroelectric power production from numerous dams.

Education
Oguni has two public elementary schools and two public middle schools operated by the town government and one public high school operated by the Yamagata Prefectural Board of Education. There is also one private high school.

Transportation

Railway
 East Japan Railway Company -  Yonesaka Line
  -  -  -

Highway

References

External links
 
Official Website 

 
Towns in Yamagata Prefecture